The osseous spiral lamina consists of two plates of bone, and between these are the canals for the transmission of the filaments of the acoustic nerve. On the upper plate of that part of the lamina which is outside the vestibular membrane, the periosteum is thickened to form the limbus spiralis (or limbus laminæ spiralis), this ends externally in a concavity, the sulcus spiralis internus, which represents, on section, the form of the letter C.

References

External links
 http://www.anatomyatlases.org/MicroscopicAnatomy/Section16/Plate16311.shtml
 http://www.med.uiuc.edu/histo/small/atlas/objects/103.htm

Ear